HD 220466 is a F-type subgiant or main sequence star in the constellation Aquarius.  It has apparent magnitude 6.47 and is about 200 light-years away. In 1913, an apparent visual companion of apparent magnitude 10.3 was observed 1.9 arcseconds away from the star, but it is doubtful whether it exists.

References

External links
 Image HD 220466

Aquarius (constellation)
220466
115522
F-type subgiants
F-type main-sequence stars
Durchmusterung objects